Anderida peorinella is a species of snout moth in the genus Anderida. It was described by André Blanchard and Edward C. Knudson in 1985 and is from Texas, United States.

The length of the forewings is 8.1–11.2 mm for males and about 12.5 mm for females. The costal half of the forewing, above the median vein, is glossy yellowish white, with brownish streaks in the intervenular spaces over the apical half. The dorsal half below the median vein is pale brownish yellow, with a darker streak immediately below the median vein. The hindwings are pale fuscous.

References

Moths described in 1985
Phycitinae
Moths of North America